"Know You Better" is the second single from the multicultural Australian singer Mileo. The song was released on the 8 April 2016 "Know You Better" is written and produced by Mileo. It has influences of R&B & World.

Composition
"Know You Better" is about a call to a lover who's stuck in an endless cycle of loveless relationships, and while vocally, his soulful calls illicit a strong emotional connection that can pretty much resonate with us all. Mileo sang, wrote and produced the track himself, while he spent two years writing and recording new music for his album.

Once released, Know You Better went viral on multiple streaming services debuting on the Billboard "Spotify Viral 50" at number 16.

Track listings

Release history

Charts

Weekly charts

References

2016 songs
Sony Music singles
2016 singles